The Resorts World Arena is a multipurpose indoor arena located at the National Exhibition Centre (NEC) in Solihull, England. It has a capacity of 15,685 seats. The venue was built as the seventh hall of the NEC complex. After 18 months of construction, the arena opened as the "Birmingham International Arena" in December 1980 with a concert by Queen.

In 2019, Resorts World Arena had the 5th highest ticket sales of an arena venue in the United Kingdom. The Ticket Factory is the official box office for the Resorts World Arena.

History

The venue was known as Birmingham International Arena until 1 September 1983, then as NEC Arena from 5 September 1983 to 31 August 2008.

From 1 September 2008, the NEC Arena was officially renamed as the LG Arena, following a naming-rights sponsorship deal with global electronics company LG. The arena then underwent a £29 million overhaul of its facilities, paid for by loans from Birmingham City Council and regional development agency Advantage West Midlands.

Work on the LG Arena was finished mid October 2009 and the arena hosted its first concert with Tom Jones. Included in the installation were around 1,000 new seats, bringing the capacity to 16,000 to compete with venues such as The O2 Arena in London and the Manchester Arena in Manchester. Also constructed were new hospitality areas and a forum containing new bars, restaurants and other customer facilities. Prior to its first concert, the arena hosted the 2009 Horse of the Year show.

In 2011, the venue became the tenth-busiest arena in the world and was ranked 13th-busiest in 2014.

It was announced in November 2014 that as part of a sponsorship deal with the casino group, the arena would be renamed the Genting Arena from 6 January 2015. On 25 September 2018, the NEC Group announced that the Genting Arena will be renamed "Resorts World Arena" as of 3 December of this year. Genting UK will continue to sponsor the hall. The reason for the new name is to more closely align the venue with Genting's Resorts World Birmingham that is opposite the arena, which opened in October 2015.

Planned expansion
On 9 March 2020, the NEC Group announced that they had submitted a planning application to Solihull Metropolitan Borough Council to expand the arena's capacity from 15,685 to 21,600, which would make it the largest indoor arena in the United Kingdom. This development would involve the replacement of the existing roof, with an addition of an upper tier as well as other works including enhanced hospitality facilities as well as external, internal and major refurbishment works. Though unanimously approved by councillors, the plans were put on hold due to the COVID-19 pandemic in the United Kingdom.

Ticket sales

NEC Group
Parent company The NEC Group also owns and operates Utilita Arena Birmingham (previously the National Indoor Arena and Barclaycard Arena) and ICC Birmingham, both in central Birmingham, and the National Exhibition Centre.

References

External links

Indoor arenas in England
Music venues in Birmingham, West Midlands
Music venues completed in 1980
1980 establishments in England
Netball venues in England
2022 Commonwealth Games venues
Netball at the 2022 Commonwealth Games